The Old Lake County Courthouse, also known as Lake County Courthouse, in Lakeport, California is a building built in 1870.  It served Lake County as a seat of government from 1871 until 1968. Precedent-setting trials on water rights were held here, along with the "White Cap" murder trial, a notorious episode in vigilantism held here in 1890. The brick courthouse, constructed by A.P. Pettit in 1870–71, was one of the few buildings in the vicinity to survive the 1906 San Francisco earthquake with only minor damage. It is now California Historical Landmark #897 and is listed on the National Register of Historic Places (NPS-70000134). The county schools library was located in the basement until at least 1968. It is surrounded by a Lakeport City Park.

Lakeport Historic Courthouse Museum 
The Lakeport Historic Courthouse Museum is located in the historic Lake County Courthouse. The museum features exhibits of local and natural history, including Pomo Indian baskets and artifacts, local rocks and minerals, early settler history, and early Lake County Courthouse history,

References

Further reading

External links
 Lakeport Historic Courthouse Museum - City of Lakeport

County courthouses in California
Lakeport, California
History museums in California
Museums in Lake County, California
Buildings and structures in Lake County, California
California Historical Landmarks
Courthouses on the National Register of Historic Places in California
History of Lake County, California
Government buildings completed in 1870
Neoclassical architecture in California
National Register of Historic Places in Lake County, California
1870 establishments in California